Survio is an online survey system for the preparation of questionnaires, data collection and analysis and sharing the results. Survio is a project of Czech creators from the city of Brno, which is also referred to as the Czech Silicon Valley.

History

Founding
Survio was established in 2012. The project was founded by Ondřej Coufalík and Martin Pavlíček. The inspiration came in 2008 when Martin who was lying ill in the hospital, had to fill out multiple paper forms. Both men, therefore, in 2008, founded the predecessor of Survio, a company named Global Business IT s. r. o. With the idea of the questionnaire system then started the development in the South Moravian innovation center.

Development

Already in 2012 company Webnode invested, one and a half million Czech crowns (US$20 thousand) and acquired 35% stake of Survio.
This investment started very rapid growth of the online inquiry project. From the very beginning of the project, users had 11 languages available. The start of the project proved to be very successful and at the end of the first year of operation  Survio had 100 thousand users from 124 countries of the world.

Customer base

Survio is designed especially for small and medium-sized enterprises (SMEs). The service is also suitable for all who need to prepare their own questionnaires: offices, schools, students, non-profit organizations, etc. However, more and more often is Survio chosen by large, international corporations. Very often is Survio used as a solution for various surveys among the end-customers including the measurement of customer satisfaction. Surveys aimed at staff and workplace environment are also frequently applied.

Currently, Survio serves more than 1 million users from 170 countries. The system is popular in Europe and Latin America. Survio users include a number of businesses, offices, and schools including universities. Clients include IBM, Tesco, FedEx, Bosch, Oriflame, BMW, Microsoft, Ford etc.

Prices

The basic version of the Survio is available for free. Survio also offers paid premium service. In the advanced menu, there are also specific types of questionnaires, such as, for example, NPS Net promoter score or 360 degree feedback.

See also
 Comparison of survey software

References 

Mass media companies of the Czech Republic
Polling companies
Czech companies established in 2012
Companies based in Brno